Roberto Capucci (born December 2, 1930 in Rome) is an Italian fashion designer.

Biography
Capucci attended art school at Accademia di Belle Arti, where he studied with artists such as Mazzacurati, Avenali, and Libero De Libero.

In 1950, he opened his first atelier in Sistina. In 1951, for the first time, he showed his creations at Giovanni Battista Giorgini’s Villa in Florence. 

In 1952, together with other designers such as Vincenzo Ferdinandi, the Sartoria Antonelli, the Atelier Carosa, Giovannelli-Sciarra, Polinober, Germana Marucelli, the Sartoria Vanna, Jole Veneziani, and sixteen sportswear companies and boutiques, they held the first historic show at the Sala Bianca of Palazzo Pitti in Florence. A very young Oriana Fallaci, sent by the weekly Epoca, told the news.

In 1958 he created the “Linea a Scatola” (Box Line), for which he received the 'Boston Fashion Award' (Filene’s Young Talent Design Award) as the best creator of fashion along with Pierre Cardin and James Galanos.

In 1961, French critics welcomed him with enthusiasm at the Paris fashion shows. For this reason, he opened his atelier at n°4 mme rue Cambon in Paris in 1962.

In 1968, he returned to Italy and began work in his atelier at Gregoriana in Rome, where he showed his collections during the fashion calendar organized by the Camera Nazionale dell’Alta Moda. In the same year, he drew costumes for Silvana Mangano and Terence Stamp for Pier Paolo Pasolini’s movie “Teorema”.

In July 1970, he displayed his work for the first time at the Nymphaeum of Museo di Arte Etrusca at Villa Giulia in Rome, with a collection that was groundbreaking at the time, designing looks with models wearing boots with low heels, without makeup and hairstyling.

He began experimenting with the inclusion of decorative, rigid, and structural elements, juxtaposing "rich" and "poor" materials, such as precious fabrics, stones, and straw.

In 1980, Capucci left the Camera Nazionale Della Moda and decided to keep his collections out of all calendars and institutions, only presenting them when he was ready.

With the exhibition “Roberto Capucci l’Arte Nella Moda - Volume, Colore e Metodo” in 1990 at Palazzo Strozzi in Florence, his explosive season began with big praise from critics and audiences in prominent museums, including Kunsthistorisches Museum (Wien), Nordiska Museet (Stockholm), Pushkin Museum (Moscow), Philadelphia Museum of Art, Reggia di Venaria Reale (Turin).

In 1995, he was invited to show his creations at an Esposizione Internazionale di Arti Visive at La Biennale di Venezia held in 1985 -1995.

In 2005, with the Associazione Civita, he founded Fondazione Roberto Capucci to preserve his archive of 439 historical dresses, 500 signed illustrations, 22,000 original drawings, a full press release, an extensive photo, and a media library.

In 2007, he opened the Roberto Capucci Foundation Museum with exhibitions and workshops in Florence at the Villa Bardini.

In April 2013, he carried out the event “Roberto Capucci per i giovani designer. Oltre (a)gli abiti – il design prende una nuova piega” in Milan, with the Awards at Royal Palace of Milan and the exhibition/event at Palazzo Morando.

In 2010, he collaborated with artists Maurizio Martusciello and Mattia Casalegno in the audiovisual installation 'Il Gesto Sospeso', commissioned by FENDI, and premiered at the Hadrian Temple for the Rome Fashion Week.

Giorgini was considered a talent scout for “Italian High Fashion” and a creator of “Made in Italy”.

Exhibitions

Notes and references

External links

Creators: Robert Capucci  by Donna Paul at 1stdibs
Fondazione Roberto Capucci Roberto Capucci Foundation

Fashion designers from Rome
1930 births
Living people
Italian fashion designers
Businesspeople from Rome